Michele Ann Fiore (born July 29, 1970) is an American Republican politician serving as a justice of the peace for Nye County since being appointed to the position by the Nye County Commission in December 2022. She moved to Nye County in November 2022 after losing the race for Nevada State Treasurer in the 2022 election. She was a member of the Nevada Assembly from 2012 to 2016. Fiore, who represented much of northwestern Clark County, served two Assembly terms. On December 7, 2015, she confirmed that she would not seek reelection, and would instead enter the 2016 race for Nevada's 3rd congressional district in southern Clark County. On June 15, 2016, Fiore placed third in the primary, with 18% of the vote. She was elected to the Las Vegas City Council in 2017 and represented Ward 6.

Fiore has been a high-profile supporter of anti-government activist Cliven Bundy, and has called Donald Trump "one of our greatest presidents". She announced on October 19, 2021, that she was running for governor of Nevada in the 2022 race, amid reports she was under FBI investigation for campaign finance matters. She is the Nevada Republican Party national committeewoman responsible for fund-raising in the state.

Issues

Campus gun carry bill
Fiore is a staunch supporter of Second Amendment rights; her 2015 Christmas card showed her family holding their guns. She sponsored Assembly Bill 148 to allow concealed firearms on the campuses of colleges and grade schools and in day care facilities. In an interview with The New York Times, Fiore said, "If these young, hot little girls on campus have a firearm, I wonder how many men will want to assault them. The sexual assaults that are occurring would go down once these sexual predators get a bullet in their head."

Same-sex marriage and medical marijuana
Fiore is noted for having been the only Republican to vote to lift the ban on same-sex marriage and to legalize medical marijuana.

Description of treatments possible under Right-to-Try bill
Fiore was a primary sponsor of the 2015 Nevada Right-to-Try bill, legislation that allows doctors to perform medical procedures that are being used in ongoing FDA-approved clinical trials but have not achieved FDA approval for terminally ill patients who are not responding to traditional medical treatment. On a February 2014 edition of her radio show, discussing Right-to-Try, Fiore described the cancer treatment by Cancer is a Fungus author Tullio Simoncini as an example of treatments that the terminally ill could access under Right-to-Try: "If you have cancer, which I believe is a fungus, and we can put a PICC line into your body and we're flushing, let's say, salt water, sodium carbonate, through that line, and flushing out the fungus. ... These are some procedures that are not FDA-approved in America that are very inexpensive, cost-effective."

On her February 21, 2015, broadcast, the theme was the concept of Right-to-Try; the bill had been introduced in the Assembly the previous week. At the top of the show Fiore raised the topic of her 2014 comments, "an issue that I have gotten a lot of questions about". She said, "I made comments about cancer that I didn't put in the proper context." She had had a friend with cancer who had made "radical improvement using a doctor out of Italy's treatment covered in his book and his book was called Cancer Is A Fungus ... it was a tumor therapy of some sort. The point I was trying to illustrate was that people like my friend ... should have the right to decide their own fate and try experimental treatments like this." She did not repeat that cancer is a fungus or that salt water could flush it out. After Fiore addressed the issue she and guest Jackie See, M.D., defended the Simoncini treatment and other alternative techniques as viable and a means by which the U.S. could lead the world medically if regulation and bureaucracy were reduced and doctors could "explor[e] all the treatments not knowing where the next breakthrough will come from." After the 2015 broadcast, she received renewed national attention for her 2014 statements.

Using sodium bicarbonate (baking soda) as a cancer treatment is espoused by Tullio Simoncini and is known as the Simoncini cancer treatment. This method has not been proven, and no evidence suggests that it or treatment with salt water works, but if either were to be accepted under the bill's requirements it could be legally considered a non-FDA-approved treatment that a terminally ill patient in Nevada could request. The bill that Fiore introduced eight days before her 2015 show requires that the drug, product or device "have successfully completed Phase 1 of a clinical trial" and that it be "tested in a clinical trial that has been approved by the [FDA]."

Controversies

Gun use against law enforcement
In March 2016, Fiore was interviewed by the Las Vegas Sun. When asked about her support of militants involved in the occupation of the Malheur National Wildlife Refuge earlier that year, she said,

In April 2016, Fiore was interviewed for the KLAS 8 television show "Politics NOW". Discussing whether the 2014 armed resistance against federal agents was justified (the agents were in Bunkerville, Nevada, to confiscate cattle owned by rancher Cliven Bundy because of defaulted grazing fees), she said,

In May 2016, the Nevada Association of Public Safety Officers sent a letter denouncing Fiore's statements, concluding,

In response, Fiore told KTNV 13 Action News that her original statement referred to federal Bureau of Land Management agents, not local police. She described BLM law enforcement agents as "wannabe cops" and the BLM as "a bureaucratic agency of terrorism that terrorized Americans, especially ranchers." When pressed about the meaning of her previous statement, she said,

Involvement in the Bundy standoff
In April 2014, Fiore was interviewed by MSNBC's Chris Hayes and by Fox News's Sean Hannity about the armed confrontation at Bunkerville, Nevada, between law enforcement officers and Cliven Bundy and his supporters. The interviews were shared thousands of times on social media. Fiore said, "The federal government should not show up with guns to collect on a debt" and called for the termination of "whoever ordered this to be done."

Statement about wanting to shoot Syrian refugees herself
On November 21, 2015, on her weekly AM radio program on KDWN, Fiore explained why she had not signed a Nevada Assembly Republican caucus letter that called for a review of federal safeguards before Nevada would resettle Syrian refugees. She said, "We didn't know anything about the letter, nor did we get invited to be on the letter." She went on, "He's like, 'The Syrian refugees.' I'm like, 'What, are you kidding me? I'm about to fly to Paris and shoot 'em in the head myself.' I mean, I am not OK with Syrian refugees. I'm not OK with terrorists. I'm OK with putting them down, blacking them out. Just put a piece of brass in their ocular cavity and end their miserable life. I'm good with that."

On December 7, 2015, she told the Associated Press, "I was not talking about the refugees." She added, "I do not want Syrian refugees in our state, period", and said that she did not trust the refugee vetting process to screen out terrorists.

2016 holiday photo
In December 2015, Fiore sent her constituents a 2016 calendar that included a family Christmas portrait under the month of December featuring her immediate family all holding guns, and her grandchildren, one of whom was holding what appeared to be a handgun. The photo went viral on Facebook and drew criticism for depicting a small child holding a weapon.

IRS investigation
In December 2014, it was reported that the Internal Revenue Service (IRS) had filed dozens of tax liens totaling about $1 million against Fiore and her home healthcare businesses, Always There 4 You and Always There Personal Care. The liens against the businesses involved unpaid employee payroll taxes. In response, Fiore stated, "I am one hundred percent in compliance with IRS, period." Fiore blamed her ex-husband, who at one time acted as her accountant, and a former employee who stole from her while at the same time sent fraudulent documents to her current accountant to hide the embezzlement.

The fallout from her issues with the IRS led to her being removed as majority leader and chair of the Assembly Taxation Committee. Fiore was reinstated to her former position less than 24 hours after her removal. It was reported that she reacted to the removal by saying there was a war on women in the Assembly Republican Caucus. "It was a total misquote," Fiore said. "Nevada Republicans are not waging a war on women. We have a group in our caucus that are waging a war on conservatives."

Voiding of home healthcare license
On November 3, 2015, the Nevada Department of Health and Human Services's Bureau of Health Care Quality and Compliance (HCQC) voided Fiore's license to operate Always There 4 You, a home healthcare service. Always There 4 You and another Fiore-owned home healthcare service, Always There Personal Care, received about $6 million (net) in Medicaid reimbursements between 2011 and March 2015. Although in Nevada an unannounced inspection of such companies' business records is required to be completed every 18 months, in 2013 and 2015 health department inspectors were blocked several times from reviewing Always There 4 You's records. They were denied access by office staff, by Fiore's mother, and by Fiore.

In July 2015, after receiving a formal warning, Fiore met with health department officials in "a so-called conciliation process that essentially gives Fiore one more chance to comply". Fiore said the meeting was "productive" and she was "prepared to welcome inspectors in the future with coffee and doughnuts." In September 2015 an inspector found the Always There 4 You office dark and its door locked, with no notice posted on the premises explaining why. In October 2015 the Bureau sent a certified letter requesting clarification and again reminding Fiore that her license could be suspended or revoked. Fiore did not reply.

On November 3, after officials arrived to find another business moving into the office location, the Bureau administratively closed the Always There 4 You license and notified Fiore. That night, Fiore issued a press release "regarding allegations that her home health care company was shut down by the government." "With the signing of a Notice Of Dissolution last week, I have completely closed my home health care business. While the media will try to tell you that my business was shut down by the government, I would like to lay that rumor to rest."

The next day, the press release contents, under the title "You're Fired, State Inspectors!" and addressed to "Friends", were published on Fiore's website. "You're Fired, State Inspectors!" reproduces an article titled "When 'They' Win, We All Lose," written for a local magazine the month before, which begins, "By the time you read this, my home health care business will be a memory ... It happened because 'They' won."

In "You're Fired" Fiore disclosed that she had been closing down her business for eight weeks. Always There 4 You was officially dissolved November 9, 2015.

Remarks at 2020 Clark County Republican Party convention
Fiore was accused of having made "racially charged remarks" at the June 6, 2020, Clark County Republican Convention. The Clark County Republican Party released a statement criticizing her remarks.

Blue Lives Matter March
After the unrest and riots resulting from the murder of George Floyd, conservative talk show host Wayne Allyn Root organized a Blue Lives Matter march on Las Vegas Blvd scheduled for June 13, 2020, of which Fiore was to be a co-host. A flyer was circulated with the Las Vegas Metropolitan Police Department's emblem displayed across the bottom. The next day, the City of Las Vegas issued a statement saying the event was not officially sanctioned. The Metropolitan Police Department issued a statement reading, "The Las Vegas Metropolitan Police Department recently learned of a planned rally for Blue Lives Matter that used images of our badge on their flyers. While we uphold the first amendment right for all groups to peacefully assemble, we did not authorize permission for the organizers to use the LVMPD badge as the department was not part of the planning of this event."

The event was postponed the next day and Las Vegas NAACP President Roxann McCoy said in a news release, "The NAACP Las Vegas is appalled that Las Vegas, Nevada City Council members Mayor Pro Tem Michelle Fiore, Councilwoman Victoria Seaman, Councilman Stavros Anthony do not care to understand Black citizens of Las Vegas and the injustices we constantly endure."

Capitol storming reaction
Days after the storming of the United States Capitol, Fiore attended the Republican National Committee's winter meeting on Amelia Island, Florida, where she told the New York Times, "I surely embrace President Trump."

Elections
2010 Fiore first ran for Nevada's 1st congressional district in the June 8 eight-way Republican primary, but lost to perennial candidate Kenneth Wegner.
2012 When Republican Assemblyman Richard McArthur ran for Nevada Senate and left the Assembly District 4 seat open, Fiore was unopposed in the June 12 Republican primary and won the three-way November 6 general election with 14,239 votes (53.11%) against Democratic nominee Kenneth Evans and Independent American candidate Jonathan Hansen.
2014 Fiore, now an incumbent, faced her first reelection challenge from Democrat Jeff Hinton, a former U.S. Marine and current schoolteacher. Fiore won by nearly 25 percent.
2016 Fiore decided to give up her assembly seat and run for election in the open 3rd congressional district. She came in third behind perennial candidate and businessman Danny Tarkanian and State Senator Michael Roberson.
2017 With City Councilman Steve Ross retiring, Fiore ran for Ward 6 in northwestern Las Vegas, about half of which overlaps with her old assembly district. Though municipal elections in Nevada are nonpartisan, Fiore framed the contest as a referendum on political ideology in an area where Republicans outnumber Democrats. Fiore faced a crowded field, including the retiring councilman's wife, Kelli. Fiore led with 46% of the vote in the first round. In the second round, Fiore defeated Kelli Ross, 51%–49%. She was named mayor pro tem of the City Council on July 3, 2019.
2020 Fiore was reelected as Republican National Committeewoman in June by a vote of 220 to 27. She stepped down as Las Vegas City Council Mayor Pro Tem on June 16 to focus on the country’s racial divide following a couple weeks of controversy after the Clark County Republican Party rebuked “racially charged” remarks she made at the group’s convention.

Committees
Assembly Commerce and Labor 
Assembly Judiciary 
Assembly Legislative Operations and Elections 
Assembly Transportation

2022 elections
On October 19, 2021, Fiore announced her candidacy for governor of Nevada in the 2022 Nevada gubernatorial election. On March 17, 2022, she withdrew from the gubernatorial race to run for Nevada State Treasurer in the 2022 election. On November 8, 2022, Fiore lost the general election to incumbent Democrat Zach Conine.

References

External links
Official page at the Nevada Legislature
Campaign website

 

1970 births
21st-century American politicians
21st-century American women politicians
Las Vegas City Council members
Living people
Republican Party members of the Nevada Assembly
Politicians from Brooklyn
Women state legislators in Nevada